Michel Ocelot (born 27 October 1943) is a French writer, designer, storyboard artist and director of animated films and television programs (formerly also animator, background artist, narrator and other roles in earlier works) and a former president of the International Animated Film Association. Though best known for his 1998 debut feature Kirikou and the Sorceress, his earlier films and television work had already won Césars and British Academy Film Awards among others and he was made a chevalier of the Légion d'honneur on 23 October 2009, presented to him by Agnès Varda who had been promoted to commandeur earlier the same year. In 2015 he got the Lifetime Achievement Award at the World Festival of Animated Film - Animafest Zagreb.

Biography
He was born in 1943 to a Catholic family then in Villefranche-sur-Mer, on the French Riviera, who relocated to Guinea, West Africa for much of his childhood, moving back to Anjou in France during his adolescence. As a teenager he played with and created toy theatre productions and was inspired to become an animator through viewing Hermína Týrlová's Vzpoura hraček (The Revolt of Toys, 1946) and discovering a book on DIY stop motion animation. He was never formally taught animation, however, and instead studied the decorative arts, first at the Ecole régionale des Beaux-Arts in Angers, then the École nationale supérieure des arts décoratifs in Paris and the California Institute of the Arts in Los Angeles. He now lives and operates from an atelier-apartment in Paris.

His œuvre is characterised by having worked in a variety of animation techniques, typically employing a different medium for each new project, but almost exclusively within the genres of fairy tales and fairytale fantasy. Some, such as Kirikou and the Sorceress, are loose adaptations of existing folk tales, others are original stories constructed from the "building blocks" of such tales. He describes the process as "I play with balls that innumerable jugglers have already used for countless centuries. These balls, passed down from hand to hand, are not new. But today I'm the one doing the juggling." Visually, they are characterised by a rigid use, excepting brief transitions between them, of the side-on, straight-on and ¾ viewpoints  of silhouette and cutout animation (such as that of Lotte Reiniger and Karel Zeman) even when working in mediums which allow for greater flexibility and dynamic viewpoints. Though often likened to Reiniger, he himself finds her films "rather archaic and not very attractive" and does not list them among his favourites. He also admires the art of ancient Egypt, pottery of ancient Greece, Hokusai and illustrators such as Arthur Rackham, W. Heath Robinson and his brothers and, most of all, Aubrey Beardsley. He was president of the Association international du film d'animation (ASIFA) from 1994 to 2000.

While already a household name in much of continental Europe, and greatly respected by Studio Ghibli's Isao Takahata (who has directed the Japanese dubs of his films), his success in the more conservative markets of the United Kingdom, United States and Germany has been restricted by a mixed reaction to the realistic and non-sexual, but nevertheless omnipresent nudity in his breakout film Kirikou and the Sorceress. Although all of these countries' boards of film classification have approved it as being suitable for all ages, cinemas and TV channels have been reluctant to show it due to the possible backlash from offended parents. In 2007, he gained some further recognition within the English-speaking world by directing a music video for the Icelandic musician Björk, the lead single from her album Volta.

In another 2008 interview he mentioned as further examples of favourite and influential artistic works Voltaire's letters, The Heron and the Crane, Crac, Father and Daughter, the first part of Grand Illusion, Neighbors, the Eiffel Tower, Millesgården, Persian miniatures, Jean Giraud's free drawing and illustrations by Kay Nielsen.

Filmography

Notes

Further reading

External links

  
 
 Information on and stills from his short films
 Stills from Les Trois Inventeurs and Azur et Asmar
 Interview with Björk and stills from "Earth Intruders" video
 Official site of the Association international du film d'animation
 The Studio Ghibli collection at Walt Disney Studios Japan 

French animated film directors
BAFTA winners (people)
César Award winners
Chevaliers of the Légion d'honneur
French animators
French film directors
French male screenwriters
French screenwriters
French storyboard artists
French voice directors
International Animated Film Association
Living people
People from Alpes-Maritimes
1943 births